Kadaram Kondan is a 2019 Indian Tamil-language action thriller film directed by Rajesh M. Selva and produced by Kamal Haasan. The film stars Vikram in the lead role and Akshara Haasan and Abi Hassan in supporting roles. It was shot between September 2018 and January 2019, and released on 19 July 2019, along with its Telugu-dubbed version Mr. KK. It is an official remake of the 2010 French film Point Blank.

Plot 
 
In the Petronas Towers, a man breaks out of an office after a botched robbery, being chased by two assassins. He is hit by a bike when they corner him, leaving him in a coma.

Dr. Vasu Rajagopalan, who recently moved to Kuala Lumpur with his pregnant wife Aatirah, is assigned to the hospital where the comatose robber has been admitted. After a botched murder attempt on the robber's life, Vasu contacts the cops, which assigns Inspector Kalpana Rangaswamy to the case. Vasu is given her contact number, advising him to contact her if he finds anything suspicious. Upon returning home, a man knocks Vasu out and kidnaps Aatirah. When Vasu regains consciousness, He gets a call from the assailant, who asks him to release the robber in exchange for Aatirah.  Meanwhile, Kalpana uncovers the identity of the robber: KK, a notorious criminal and ex-army commando wanted for burglary and contraband dealing. She rushes to the hospital with her associates - Navin and Catherine, narrowly missing Vasu, who had managed to exfiltrate KK from the hospital.

Kalpana's rival team, headed by Vincent Rajadurai, who is notorious for their brutal ways of solving criminal cases, is also on the heels of KK's case. He explains to Kalpana that KK is connected to the recent murder of a wealthy industrialist and warns her to step aside, to which she refuses. Meanwhile, Vasu demands KK to release Aatirah at KL Sentral, in exchange for him to be delivered safely, to which he agrees. At the exchange point, Aatirah and KK are almost on the verge of being exchanged, but the two assassins who had pursued KK earlier arrive, forcing the duos to escape. The assailant brings Aatirah back to his hideout, but is killed by the two assassins, who forcefully abduct Aatirah.
 
Vasu and KK take refuge at KK's safe house. While KK is distracted, Vasu manages to contact Kalpana, alerting her of his dire situation. Kalpana arrives at the safe house, but not before Vincent's team does. She is then shot dead by Vincent, who is revealed to be a dirty cop. After Vincent leaves, KK manages to subdue his captors and injures one of Vincent's men - Umar, demanding the truth behind his botched burglary attempt. Umar reveals to KK that he was merely a pawn in Vincent's criminal deeds; Vincent had been hired by a businessman to kill his father - the industrialist, in order for the latter to inherit his father's wealth. Vincent had recorded the event on a spy camera and had arranged for his colleague, Anand Makaio - KK's boss, to cover their tracks. Makaio had sent KK to the industrialist's office at the Petronas Towers in the name of retrieving the files of his criminal cases. In reality, it was a trap set by Vincent, who had to have someone framed for the murder. Vincent's men (the two assassins) had attempted to murder KK as well they had retreated after KK's accident.

The police arrive at the safehouse, forcing KK and Vasu to escape. Vasu is framed for Kalpana's murder, making him a wanted fugitive. The police chase the duo around the city, but they fail to catch them. Vasu begs KK to save his wife, to which he consents. KK coordinates with his associates and forms a plan to save Aatirah; Vasu learns that Aatirah's kidnapper was actually KK's younger brother, Nanda. KK corners Makaio and has him create a diversion in order to distract Vincent, before killing him for his betrayal. Meanwhile, Aatirah is taken into police custody under Vincent's watch; he plans to have her murdered after killing Vasu.

The next day, KK puts his plan into action - he and his associates coordinate mass robberies across the city and have the culprits arrested by the police under Vincent's jurisdiction, thus creating mass chaos at his police station. As KK had expected, Vincent leaves to meet Makaio (as part of the diversion). With Vincent out of the way, KK and Vasu infiltrate the police station under the guise of police officers and attempt to break into Vincent's safe - which contains the footage of the industrialist's murder. Annie, Vincent's colleague, attempts to have Aatirah murdered. She is incapacitated by Vasu, but not before she manages to injure Aatirah. Vincent, upon discovering Makaio's murder, deduces KK's deception and rushes back. He fights with KK, resulting in the latter knocking the former out. KK acquires the pen drive containing the footage of the assassination and plants it on Vasu, who has been captured by Catherine. She discovers the pen drive in Vasu's pocket and plays it, exposing Vincent, who is then arrested for his criminal deeds. Vasu is released and is escorted to the hospital where Aatirah has been admitted to; she is shown to have narrowly avoided a miscarriage. She gives birth to a healthy daughter and has an emotional reunion with Vasu, while KK silently escapes.

7 years later, on Vasu's daughter's birthday, Vasu and Aatirah discover that Vincent has been murdered under mysterious circumstances while on parole. They also receive a gift from KK - containing a necklace that Aatirah had once worn - implying that KK had murdered Vincent, thus getting his revenge.

Cast 

 Vikram as KK, a criminal who previously used several pseudonyms
 Akshara Haasan as Aatirah
 Abi Hassan as Vasu Rajagopalan
 Lena as Kalpana Rengaswamy
 Vikas Shrivastav as Vincent Rajadurai
 Puravalan as Navin
 Ravindra Vijay as Umar Ahamed
 Cherry Mardia as Catherine Williams
 Rajesh Kumar as Amaldas David, Chief of Police
 Jasmine Kaur as Annie Jayanathan
 Siddhartha Shankar as Nandha
 Jawaharlal as Anad Makaio
 Mukundh as a duty doctor
 Sandeep as an assassin 
 Senthil as an assassin 
 Padmini as Kumutha
 Baby Dhanyashree as Aatirah and Vasu's daughter
 Preetha as a gynaecologist

Production 
Film producer Chandrahasan initially wanted to make a film under his banner Raaj Kamal Films International with his brother Kamal Haasan starring and Rajesh M. Selva directing. Selva got this offer immediately after the release of his Thoongaa Vanam, which also starred Kamal. But Kamal became busy in his political career, so Selva instead approached Vikram who agreed to act in the still-untitled film after being impressed with the story Selva narrated to him. Chandrahasan later died, therefore he could not produce the project.

On 30 August 2018, Kamal officially announced the still-untitled film which he would produce with Selva directing, while Vikram, Akshara Haasan, and Abi Hassan would star. Srinivas R. Gutha was announced as the cinematographer, while Praveen K. L. joined as editor. The film, which was co-produced by R. Ravindran of Trident Arts, began filming on the same day. The film's title Kadaram Kondan and first look poster were revealed on 6 November, the eve of Kamal's birthday. The film was shot in Kuala Lumpur for a month, where the shooting schedule ended in late November. Principal photography ended on 9 January 2019, with the exception of a song sequence and "a few patch works".

Soundtrack 
The soundtrack is composed by Ghibran, continuing his association with the director and Kamal after Thoongaa Vanam. The music rights were bought by Muzik 247.

Release 
Kadaram Kondan was released on 19 July 2019, alongside its Telugu-dubbed version Mr. KK.

Box office
According to trade estimates, the Kadaram Kondan collection managed to rake in Rs 50 crore in the opening weekend at the box office.

Critical reception 

M. Suganth of The Times of India wrote, "The action scenes make Kadaram Kondan a visceral experience, even though Rajesh Selva’s filmmaking falls short on flair. As long as we get a chase or a shootout, the film feels thrilling enough. It is only in the quieter moments, like the initial scenes that set up the story, that get us restless. Thankfully, Ghibran’s energetic wall-to-wall score lends the film momentum. And Vikram ensures that we don’t leave disappointed".

Srivatsan S of The Hindu wrote, "A ‘time bomb’ narrative that takes a while to explode. But when it does, it's a smart guessing game".

India Today reviewer Kirubhakar Purushothaman rated the film 3 out of 5 stars and wrote, "Kadaram Kondan is a decent entertainer if one is ready to overlook a few silly contrivances and over-the-top heroism".

Baradwaj Rangan of Film Companion wrote, "We want a series of set pieces that tumble into one another with wit and elegance and heart-stopping precision. What we get is indifferently staged “scenes” that feel distant and disconnected. (The least you expect in these films is technique.)"

Controversy 
Although 90 per cent of the film was shot in Malaysia, it was not released there. According to Lotus Five Star, holder of the film's distribution and theatrical rights in Malaysia, the film was banned per orders of LPF (Film Censorship Board of Malaysia) due to the story's portrayal of the Royal Malaysian Police (PDRM) in a negative light and for portraying police officers as corrupt and for scenes which supposedly inaccurately and misleadingly represent the police force. In addition, the makers of the film failed to get necessary police permits to shoot scenes in Malaysia; the Malaysian law requires that film production receives permission from the relevant authorities such as FINAS, PUSPAL and others before shooting.

References

External links 
 

Films scored by Mohamaad Ghibran
Films shot in Kuala Lumpur
Indian action thriller films
2019 action thriller films
2019 films
2010s Tamil-language films
Indian remakes of French films